The Azerbaijan Athletics Federation is the governing body for the sport of athletics in Azerbaijan.

Affiliations 
International Association of Athletics Federations (IAAF)
European Athletic Association (EAA)
Azerbaijan Olympic Committee

National records 
The federation maintains the Azerbaijan records in athletics.

External links 
Official webpage 

Azerbaijan
Athletics
National governing bodies for athletics
1923 establishments in Azerbaijan
Sports organizations established in 1923